The Lago Colhué Huapí Formation is a Late Cretaceous geologic formation of the Chubut Group in the Golfo San Jorge Basin in Patagonia, Argentina. The formation, named after Lake Colhué Huapí, is overlain by the Salamanca Formation of the Río Chico Group and in some areas by the Laguna Palacios Formation.

The strata of the Lago Colhué Huapé Formation were thought to pertain to the Bajo Barreal Formation, but are now recognized as a distinct stratigraphic unit in their own right.

Vertebrate paleofauna 
Taxa recovered from the Lago Colhué Huapí Formation include the sauropods Aeolosaurus colhuehaupiensis, Argyrosaurus, and Elaltitan, as well as the hadrosaurid Secernosaurus and the probable elasmarian ornithopod Sektensaurus. The dubious possible ceratopsian Notoceratops was also present. The apex predator was an unnamed megaraptorid.

See also 
 List of dinosaur-bearing rock formations
 List of stratigraphic units with few dinosaur genera

References

Bibliography 
 
 
 
 
 
 
 

Geologic formations of Argentina
Upper Cretaceous Series of South America
Cretaceous Argentina
Campanian Stage
Maastrichtian Stage of South America
Tuff formations
Sandstone formations
Fluvial deposits
Fossiliferous stratigraphic units of South America
Paleontology in Argentina
Formations
Geology of Patagonia
Geology of Chubut Province
Colhué Huapí